The Peruvian Medal of Valor is awarded by the Republic of Peru to members of the Peruvian Armed Forces who have demonstrated tremendous acts of bravery.

Recipients
Operation Chavín de Huántar operatives

References

Courage awards
Orders, decorations, and medals of Peru